The Weaver–Dunn procedure is a generally successful type of surgery involved in the treatment of severe separated shoulders developed by James K. Weaver, M.D., Albuquerque, New Mexico, and Harold K. Dunn, M.D., Salt Lake City, Utah, in the early 1970s.

The procedure is done to essentially replace the coracoclavicular ligaments with the coracoacromial ligament.

There is currently no "gold standard" surgery to repair acromioclavicular separations, and many surgeries have been created.  However, this is one of the more common fixes.

The original surgery is described as follows.

 Resection of the distal 2 cm of distal clavicle
 Detaching the acromial end of the coracoacromial ligament, and possibly shortening it.
 Attaching the remaining ligament to the remaining clavicle with sutures.

Modern variations of the procedure may use additional fixation methods to better stabilize the distal clavicle end as the original construction is rather weak compared to the unharmed shoulder. Even with these modifications, the modern surgeries do not match intact coracoclavicular ligament strength in cadaveric testing. However, such testing does not account for what the living body may perform in the process of healing, in terms of joint remodeling, etc.

See also
Shoulder surgery

References

Shoulder surgery